James R. Kelley (March 1, 1839, Ireland–August 9, 1871) was a Speaker of the Pennsylvania House of Representatives in 1866.

Kelley was elected to the Pennsylvania House of Representatives in 1864 and served through 1866.

See also
 Speaker of the Pennsylvania House of Representatives

References

Speakers of the Pennsylvania House of Representatives
Democratic Party members of the Pennsylvania House of Representatives
1839 births
1871 deaths
Irish emigrants to the United States (before 1923)
19th-century American politicians